Bhakta Raghunath is a 1960 Telugu-language biographical film, based on the life of Raghunatha dasa Goswami, produced by G. Sadasivudu under the G.V.S. Productions banner and directed by Samudrala Sr. It stars Kanta Rao, Jamuna and N. T. Rama Rao in a special appearance, with music composed by Ghantasala.

Plot 
Raghunatha is the son of Venkataramayya, an overseas businessman. Annapurna is the daughter of Veeraiah, a rich man of the same town. They both love each other and both families also like the proposal and perform their engagement. Unfortunately, Venkataramayya is bankrupted and he dies. Raghunath clears all the debts by selling the property and wants to tour the country. Annapurna tells him that she cannot marry any other person, and will die if her parents fix another alliance. Raghunatha agrees to marry her after he returns. Raghunatha's mother also dies on tour. Finally, Raghunatha reaches, where he meets Swamy Chidananda and he also comes in touch with Rangadasu, a cheat in a Sages form who heckles him. Raghunatha wants to kill himself but is rescued by divine Lord Krishna, and people start liking him. Rangadasu engages people to kill him, Chidananda Swamy rescues him, takes him to his Ashram and teaches him to practice yoga.

Meanwhile, Annapurna's mother Kameswari fixes another alliance to her. Raghunatha learns of this and he reaches his hometown. Kameswari poisons Raghunatha, but nothing happens to him. At midnight he was taken away by unknown people, but Swamy Chidananda arrives, protects him and also performs the marriage of Raghunatha and Annapurna. After the marriage, the couple reaches Puri and start living in the Ashram. Rangadasu is envious about his popularity, hence he makes people doubt his devotion. One evening many people visit Raghunatha's Ashram, so, Annapurna sells her jewelry to feed them. Due to heavy rain, all shops are closed. Only one person on the way stops her and says that he will arrange the food if she agrees to fulfill his lust. Now Annapurna is in a dilemma and says that her God will fulfill his good wish. After the guests are honored in an appropriate manner, the person comes to the Ashram and calls her. Annapurna introduces him to Raghunatha and tells him about her promise. The rest of the story is about whether Raghunatha agrees to Annapurna's promise; did God create some more problems or tests, and what happens to the couple.

Cast 
N. T. Rama Rao as Lord Krishna
Kanta Rao as Bhakta Raghunath
Jamuna as Annapurna
V. Nagayya as Swamy
Gummadi as Balrama
C.S.R.
Relangi as Veeraiah
Peketi Sivaram
Suryakaantham
Nirmalamma

Soundtrack 

Music composed by Ghantasala. Lyrics were written by Samudrala Sr-Samudrala Jr.

References 

Indian biographical films
Hindu devotional films
Films scored by Ghantasala (musician)
1960s biographical films